Łukowice Brzeskie  (German Laugwitz) is a village in the administrative district of Gmina Skarbimierz, within Brzeg County, Opole Voivodeship, in south-western Poland.

The village has an approximate population of 654.

References

Villages in Brzeg County